The 2015 IAAF Road Race Label Events were the eighth edition of the global series of road running competitions given Label status by the International Association of Athletics Federations (IAAF). All six World Marathon Majors had Gold Label status. The series included a total of 88 road races: 43 Gold, 27 Silver and 18 Bronze. In terms of distance, 55 races were marathons, 18 were half marathons, 10 were 10K runs, and 5 were held over other distances. 

The Boulogne-Billancourt Half Marathon was cancelled two days before its race date due to the November 2015 Paris attacks.

Races

References

Race calendar
Calendar 2015 IAAF Label Road Races. IAAF. Retrieved 2019-09-22.

2015
IAAF Road Race Label Events